Charlotte Becker (born 19 May 1983 in Datteln, North Rhine-Westphalia) is a German professional racing cyclist, who currently rides for UCI Women's Continental Team . She competed at the 2012 Summer Olympics in the women's road race, but finished over the time limit. She also competed on the track in the women's team pursuit for the national team.

Her older sister Christina Becker is also a track cyclist and competed together with her in the team pursuit.

Major results

Track

2000
 3rd  Individual pursuit, UCI Junior World Championships
2001
 3rd  Individual pursuit, UCI Junior World Championships
2002
 3rd Individual pursuit, National Championships
2004
 1st  Points race, UEC European Under-23 Championships
2005
 1st  Points race, UEC European Under-23 Championships
2006
 2nd  Scratch, 2006–07 UCI Track Cycling World Cup Classics, Sydney
2007
 National Championships
2nd Individual pursuit
2nd Points race
2008
 1st  Scratch, 2007–08 UCI Track Cycling World Cup Classics, Los Angeles
 2nd  Team pursuit, 2008–09 UCI Track Cycling World Cup Classics, Manchester
 3rd  Team pursuit, UCI World Championships
2009
 3rd  Team pursuit, 2008–09 UCI Track Cycling World Cup Classics, Copenhagen
 3rd  Points race, 2009–10 UCI Track Cycling World Cup Classics, Cali
2010
 Perth International Track Cycling Grand Prix
1st Points race
3rd Scratch
 2nd  Team pursuit, 2010–11 UCI Track Cycling World Cup Classics, Melbourne
2011
 2nd  Team pursuit, UEC European Championships
 3rd  Team pursuit, 2011–12 UCI Track Cycling World Cup, Astana
2012
 Perth International Track Cycling Grand Prix
1st Points race
1st Scratch
2018
 National Championships
1st  Scratch
1st  Points race
1st  Team pursuit
 3rd  Points race, 2018–19 UCI Track Cycling World Cup, Saint-Quentin-en-Yvelines
 3rd  Team pursuit, UEC European Championships
2019
 2nd  Team pursuit, 2018–19 UCI Track Cycling World Cup, Hong Kong

Road

2001
 6th Road race, UCI Junior Road World Championships
2006
 1st  Time trial, National Road Championships
2007
 2nd Time trial, National Road Championships
 6th Overall Holland Ladies Tour
 6th Sparkassen Giro
 9th Durango-Durango Emakumeen Saria
2008
 1st Overall Holland Ladies Tour
 3rd Time trial, National Road Championships
 3rd Open de Suède Vårgårda
 3rd Chrono des Nations
 5th Rund um die Nürnberger Altstadt
 6th Overall Gracia–Orlová
 8th Australia World Cup
 9th Time trial, UCI Road World Championships
2009
 1st Overall Albstadt-Frauen-Etappenrennen
1st Stage 1
 1st Stage 2 Thüringen Rundfahrt der Frauen
 1st Stage 2 (TTT) Tour de l'Aude Cycliste Féminin
 2nd Rund um das Theater
 3rd Overall Giro della Toscana Int. Femminile – Memorial Michela Fanini
 National Road Championships
4th Road race
4th Time trial
 4th Open de Suède Vårgårda TTT
 5th Rund um den Elm
 6th Overall Ster Zeeuwsche Eilanden
 7th National Hill Climb Championships
 7th Frühjahrsstraßenpreis RSC Fürth
 7th Allgäuer Straßenpreis
 8th Overall Tour du Grand Montréal
 8th Gran Premio Brissago - Lago Maggiore
2010
 National Road Championships
1st  Road race
2nd Time trial
 Open de Suède Vårgårda
1st Team time trial
8th Road race
 1st GP Ciudad de Valladolid
 1st Cologne Classic
 1st Ronde van Rijssen
 1st Rund in Hamm
 1st Rund um Düren
 4th Overall Holland Ladies Tour
 4th Overall Tour of Chongming Island
 4th Ronde van Drenthe
 5th Omloop Rond het Ronostrand
 6th Overall La Route de France
 6th GP de Plouay – Bretagne
 6th Omloop van Borsele
 7th 7-Dorpenomloop Aalburg
 7th Novilon Eurocup Ronde van Drenthe
 9th Drentse 8 van Dwingeloo
2011
 1st Open de Suède Vårgårda TTT
 1st Rund um den Elm
 1st City Trophy Elsy Jacobs Team Time Trial
 Giro della Toscana Int. Femminile – Memorial Michela Fanini
1st Stages 1 (TTT) & 7
 National Road Championships
2nd Time trial
6th Road race
 2nd Overall Trophée d'Or Féminin
1st Stages 2 (TTT) & 3
 2nd Overall Ladies Tour of Qatar
 2nd Omloop van Borsele
 3rd Amgen Tour of California Women's Time Trial
 3rd Tour of Chongming Island World Cup
 6th Profronde van Made
 8th Wielerdag van Monster
 10th GP Ciudad de Valladolid
2012
 1st  Team time trial, UCI Road World Championships (with Ellen van Dijk, Amber Neben, Evelyn Stevens, Ina-Yoko Teutenberg and Trixi Worrack)
 1st Stage 2 (TTT) Holland Ladies Tour
 1st Cologne Classic
 National Road Championships
2nd Road race
4th Time trial
 2nd Durango-Durango Emakumeen Saria
 3rd Dorstener Radsportfestival
 6th Overall Giro del Trentino Alto Adige-Südtirol
 6th Tour of Chongming Island World Cup
2013
 1st Overall NSW International Grand Prix Cycling Criterium Series
 4th Launceston Cycling Classic
 5th Time trial, National Road Championships
 5th Open de Suède Vårgårda TTT
 6th Team time trial, UCI Road World Championships
 9th London Nocturne
2014
 1st  Overall Tour of Zhoushan Island
1st Stage 1
 1st Jugendrenntag der Stadt Langenhagen
 2nd Wielerronde van Valkenswaard
 National Road Championships
3rd Time trial
4th Road race
 3rd Milk Race
 4th Rotterdam
 Tour of Chongming Island
7th Overall Stage race
7th World Cup
2015
 3rd Overall Tour of Zhoushan Island
 National Road Championships
5th Road race
6th Time trial
 9th Crescent Women World Cup Vårgårda TTT
 10th Team time trial, UCI Road World Championships
 10th Overall Ladies Tour of Norway
2016
 1st 94.7 Cycle Challenge
 1st Rund in Refrath um den Preis vom Autohaus Baldsiefen
 2nd Großer Preis der Sparkasse Beckum
 3rd KZN Summer Series 1
 5th Road race, National Road Championships
 6th Team time trial, UCI Road World Championships
 7th KZN Summer Series 2
2017
 1st  Overall Tour of Zhoushan Island
1st Stage 2
 1st UNI-Radrennen
 National Road Championships
3rd Road race
7th Time trial
 4th Sparkassen Giro Bochum
 9th Team time trial, UCI Road World Championships
 9th Crescent Vårgårda UCI Women's WorldTour TTT
2018
 1st  Overall Tour of Chongming Island
1st Stage 2
 2nd Overall Tour of Zhoushan Island
1st Stage 2
 7th Overall The Princess Maha Chackri Sirindhorn's Cup "Women's Tour of Thailand"
 Combativity award Stage 4 The Women's Tour
2019
 5th Road race, National Road Championships
 8th Durango-Durango Emakumeen Saria
2020
 2nd Road race, National Road Championships

References

External links

 
 
 
 
 
 

1983 births
Living people
German female cyclists
German track cyclists
Cyclists at the 2012 Summer Olympics
Cyclists at the 2016 Summer Olympics
Olympic cyclists of Germany
People from Datteln
Sportspeople from Münster (region)
UCI Road World Champions (women)
Cyclists from North Rhine-Westphalia
20th-century German women
21st-century German women